Jin Dinghan (13 September 1930 – 28 November 2020) was a Chinese translator and professor.

He was one of the foremost translators of Hindi literature. For his contributions to the introduction of Hindi literature to foreign readers, he was honored with the World Hindi Language Honorary Award in 1993 and the Dr. George Grierson Award in 2000.

Biography
Jin was born in a highly educated family in Changsha, Hunan in 1930, with his ancestral home in Zhuji, Zhejiang. His father, Jin Yuereng, who was a senior engineer; his uncle, Jin Yuelin, who was a Chinese philosopher; his brother, Jin Dingxin, was a member of the China Zhi Gong Party Central Committee.

Jin graduated from Peking University in 1955, where he majored in Hindi language, Jin taught there when graduated. At the same time, he served as a researcher in Chinese Academy of Social Sciences.

Translation
Ramacharitamanas (Goswami Tulasidas)
The Fact of False (Yashpal)
Nirmala (Munshi Premchand)
Selected Works of Mao Zedong
Poetry of Mao Zedong

Awards
1993 World Hindi Language Honorary Award
2000 Dr. George Grierson Award

References

1930 births
Writers from Changsha
Peking University alumni
People's Republic of China translators
Hindi–Chinese translators
Chinese–Hindi translators
2020 deaths
Academic staff of Peking University
Educators from Hunan
20th-century Chinese translators
21st-century Chinese translators